The Bussard class of unprotected cruisers were built for the German Kaiserliche Marine (Imperial Navy) in the late 1880s and early 1890s. Designed for service in Germany's colonial empire, the class emphasized a long-range cruising radius and relatively heavy armament; they were also the last cruisers in the Kaiserliche Marine to be equipped with an auxiliary sailing rig. The ships were equipped with eight  guns.

All six ships served abroad for the majority of their careers, primarily in Africa and the south Pacific, where they assisted in the suppression of uprisings such as the Boxer Rebellion in China and the Sokehs Rebellion in the Caroline Islands. Cormoran participated in the seizure of the Kiautschou Bay concession in China in 1897, and Falke was involved in the Venezuela Crisis of 1902–03. Bussard and Falke were broken up for scrap in 1912, but the remaining four ships were still in service following the outbreak of World War I in August 1914.

Cormoran was based in Tsingtao with unusable engines; she was scuttled in the harbor since she was no longer operational. Geier briefly operated against British shipping in the Pacific before having to put into Hawaii for internment by the then-neutral United States. After the United States entered the war in April 1917, she was seized and commissioned into the US Navy as USS Schurz; she served as an escort until she was accidentally sunk following a collision with a freighter in June 1918. Seeadler and Condor, meanwhile, had been converted into mine storage hulks after the start of the war. Seeadler was destroyed by an accidental explosion in 1917. Condor was the only member of the class to survive the war, and she was scrapped in 1921.

Design
Through the 1870s and early 1880s, Germany built two types of cruising vessels: small, fast avisos suitable for service as fleet scouts and larger, long-ranged screw corvettes capable of patrolling the German colonial empire. A pair of new cruisers was authorized under the 1886–1887 fiscal year, intended for the latter purpose. General Leo von Caprivi, the Chief of the Imperial Admiralty, sought to modernize Germany's cruiser force. The first step in the program, the two s unprotected cruisers, provided the basis for the larger Bussard class.

The Bussard class was designed for service abroad and the design for the Bussard class was prepared in 1888. The ships were significantly larger and faster than the Schwalbe class, but mounted the same battery of guns—though only Bussard carried the same type of guns—the rest carried a newer, quick-firing model. They were also the last cruiser class in the German Kaiserliche Marine (Imperial Navy) to be equipped with a sailing rig; the subsequent unprotected cruiser  was entirely steam-powered.

General characteristics

The ships of the Bussard class all differed slightly in their characteristics.

The cruisers' hulls were constructed with transverse steel frames with yellow pine planking up to the upper deck. A layer of Muntz metal sheathing covered the hull to protect the wood from shipworm. The stem and sternposts were constructed with steel and timber. A bronze naval ram was fitted at the bow. The hull was divided into ten watertight compartments, and a double bottom was installed below the boiler rooms. The ships were good sea boats, but they rolled badly and the sponsons for the main guns caused severe vibration. Since Geier was laid down after the other five ships entered service, she was redesigned slightly to discard the sponsons, and so she did not suffer from bad vibration. They were very maneuverable, except for turns into the wind when steaming at low speed. The ships had a crew of 9 officers and 152 enlisted men. They carried a number of smaller boats, including one picket boat, one cutter, two yawls, and two dinghies.

Propulsion
The boilers were divided into two boiler rooms and were trunked into a single funnel. Steering was controlled by a single rudder.

Armament
The first ship was armed with a main battery of eight 10.5 cm K L/35 guns in single pedestal mounts, supplied with 800 rounds of ammunition in total. The five subsequent ships were equipped with newer quick-firing SK L/35 versions of the 10.5 cm guns. Two guns were placed side by side on the forecastle, two on each broadside—one in a sponson and the other in a gun port—and two side by side on the quarterdeck. Geier did not use sponsons for the second pair of guns, instead simply mounting them on the upper deck. The gun armament was rounded out by five  Hotchkiss revolver cannon for defense against torpedo boats. The first five ships were also equipped with two  torpedo tubes, both of which were mounted on the deck. Geier instead had larger  torpedo tubes. Each ship carried five torpedoes.

Ships

Service history

All six ships of the class spent the majority of their careers abroad, primarily in Germany's colonial possessions in Africa and the Pacific. Seeadler visited the United States in March 1893, along with the protected cruiser , for the belated celebrations for the 400th anniversary of Columbus's crossing of the Atlantic. In July of that year, while assigned to the East Asia Division, Bussard and Falke assisted in the suppression of Mata'afa Iosefo's revolt in Samoa, along with a British corvette. Throughout the 1890s, Seeadler was assigned to Germany's colonies in East Africa and Southwest Africa, where she suppressed local uprisings.

In November 1897, Cormoran took part in the seizure of the Kiautschou Bay concession in the Shandong Peninsula in Qing China. Geier was present in the Caribbean during the Spanish–American War in 1898, though she took no active role in the conflict. Between 1898 and 1900, Bussard and Seeadler were modernized in Germany. In 1900, Seeadler participated in the suppression of the Boxer Rebellion in China, including a blockade of the Chinese coast. In December 1902, Falke and the protected cruiser  joined British forces in the Venezuela Crisis of 1902–03 after Venezuelan forces seized a British merchant ship. The two cruisers helped British warships bombard Venezuelan coastal fortifications and blockade the coast.

Cormoran and Geier were modernized between 1907 and 1909; only Falke and Condor never returned for major dockyard work. Condor and Cormoran suppressed the Sokehs Rebellion in the Caroline Islands in January 1911, along with the light cruiser . In 1912, when the Second Balkan War broke out, Geier was stationed in the eastern Mediterranean Sea to observe the hostilities. Both Bussard and Falke were stricken from the naval register on 25 October 1912 and broken up the following year, at Hamburg and the Kaiserliche Werft in Danzig, respectively.

After the outbreak of World War I in August 1914, Seeadler was converted into a mine storage hulk in Wilhelmshaven. An accidental explosion in April 1917 destroyed the ship, and her wreck was never raised. Condor was used for the same purpose in Kiel; she survived the war and was broken up for scrap in 1921 in Hamburg. Cormoran, still stationed in Tsingtao, was scuttled in the harbor because her engines were in poor condition. Geier meanwhile operated against British merchant shipping in the Pacific following the onset of hostilities. By October, she was running low on coal and had been isolated from any sources of support; she therefore steamed to Hawaii, where she was interned by the US Navy. After the United States declared war on Germany on 6 April 1917, she was seized and commissioned as USS Schurz for use as an escort vessel. She was sunk after colliding with a merchant ship in June 1918.

Notes

References

Further reading